"Let Me In" is a song recorded by American rock singer Eddie Money and featured on his 1988 album, Nothing to Lose.  It was released as the third single from the album in 1989 and reached number 60 on the US Billboard Hot 100 and number 30 on Billboard′s Album Rock Tracks chart.

Laura Branigan version
Laura Branigan selected the song in 1989 as one of several she would record for her next album.  Working with the song's co-writer, Dennis Matkosky, Branigan co-produced the track, which appears on her 1990 album, Laura Branigan.

1988 songs
1989 singles
Eddie Money songs
Laura Branigan songs
Songs written by Dennis Matkosky
Columbia Records singles